Edmund Calamy may refer to:
 Edmund Calamy the Elder (1600–1666), English Puritan divine
 Edmund Calamy the Younger, (died in 1685) English Puritan divine, son of Edmund Calamy the Elder
 Edmund Calamy (historian) (1671–1732), British Puritan divine, son of Edmund Calamy the Younger
 Edmund Calamy IV (1697?–1755), son of the historian, dissenting minister